Omnis, Inc. is an American technical and scientific consulting and training firm. It also has a concentration in market intelligence and the emerging field of threat finance. It was founded in 2004 and has clients in government, academia and private industry. The company is located in McLean, Virginia, near Washington, D.C.

Technology research and consulting 
Omnis, Inc. is a global consulting firm with a concentration in the physical sciences, engineering, aerospace, defense, intelligence and finance. The company works with those in government, academia and private industry. 

In 2008, Omnis recruited Wall Street professional Christina Ray to develop a market intelligence practice. Ray heads Omnis’ practice in this area. She is an expert in computational finance, and is the author of several books, including the most recent one, Extreme Risk Management: Revolutionary Approaches to Evaluating and Measuring Risk.

Her interests and focus of activities involve the fusion of risk measurement methods used by the Intelligence Community and the financial community in areas that involve low frequency, high consequence events. In particular, she is involved in the fusion of structured and unstructured data for purposes of the creation of enhanced predictive analytics models used to provide early warning of tactical and strategic threats.

For example, market data from the financial markets might be fused with news data for purposes of enhanced predictive ability, situational awareness, and sensemaking.  In this effort, she and the domain experts that support the Omnis efforts utilize advanced methods appropriate to “big data”, including machine learning and topic-code modeling. 

Omnis researchers are investigating a mystery painting by Nicolas Benjamin Delapierre known as "Portrait of a seated gentleman". The goal of the research is to determine both the identity of the subject and its provenance before 1928.

Training and education 
Another area of activity for Omnis, Inc. is training and education. It specializes in critical thinking, analytic methodologies, problem solving, leadership, and a variety of other topics.  In leadership training, Omnis focuses on employing the psychological principles of positive reinforcement.

References

External links
 Omnis website
 Omnis consultant Charles Duelfer on 60 Minutes CBS News (March 13, 2011). Retrieved May 16, 2011
 Rachel Maddow interview with Charles Duelfer The Rachel Maddow Show (February 27, 2009). Retrieved May 16, 2011

2004 establishments in Virginia
American companies established in 2004
Companies based in McLean, Virginia
Consulting firms established in 2004
Consulting firms of the United States